Elections to Liverpool Town Council were held on Wednesday 1 November 1865. One third of the council seats were up for election, the term of office of each councillor being three years.

Seven of the sixteen wards were uncontested.

After the election, the composition of the council was:

Election result

Because nine of the sixteen wards were uncontested, these statistics should be taken in that context.

Ward results

* - Retiring Councillor seeking re-election

Abercromby

Castle Street

Everton

Exchange

Great George

Lime Street

North Toxteth

Pitt Street

Rodney Street

St. Anne Street

St. Paul's

St. Peter's

Scotland

South Toxteth

Vauxhall

West Derby

Aldermanic Elections

At the meeting of the Council on 9 November 1865, the terms of office of eight alderman expired.

The following eight were elected as Aldermen by the Council (Aldermen and Councillors) on 9 November 1865 for a term of six years.

* - re-elected aldermen.

By-elections

See also

 Liverpool City Council
 Liverpool Town Council elections 1835 - 1879
 Liverpool City Council elections 1880–present
 Mayors and Lord Mayors of Liverpool 1207 to present
 History of local government in England

References

1865
1865 English local elections
November 1865 events
1860s in Liverpool